Montadas is a municipality in the state of Paraíba in the Northeast Region of Brazil. It is the smallest municipality in that state.

See also
List of municipalities in Paraíba

References

Municipalities in Paraíba